Beaver Falls is an unincorporated community in Renville County, in the U.S. state of Minnesota.

History
Beaver Falls was platted in 1866, and named for nearby Beaver Creek. A post office was established at Beaver Falls in 1867, and remained in operation until 1904. Beaver Falls was the original county seat of Renville County.

Beaver Falls was listed as incorporated in the 1900 United States Census.

References

Former municipalities in Minnesota
Unincorporated communities in Renville County, Minnesota
Unincorporated communities in Minnesota